Halim Barakat is an Arab novelist and sociologist. He was born December 4, 1936, into a Greek-Orthodox Arab family in Kafroun, Syria, and raised in Beirut.

Career
Barakat received his bachelor's degree in sociology in 1955, and his master's degree in 1960 in the same field. He received both from the American University of Beirut. He received his PhD in social psychology in 1966 from the University of Michigan at Ann Arbor.
From 1966 until 1972 he taught at the American University of Beirut. He then served as research fellow at Harvard University from 1972 to 1973, and taught at the University of Texas at Austin in 1975-1976. From 1976 until 2002 he was Teaching Research Professor at The Center for Contemporary Arab Studies of Georgetown University.

Barakat has written about twenty books and fifty essays on society and culture in journals such as the British Journal of Sociology, the Middle East Journal, Mawakif and al-Mustaqbal al-Arabi. His publications are primarily concerned with difficulties facing modern Arab societies such as alienation, crises of civil society, and a need for identity, freedom and justice. He has also published seven novels and a collection of short stories. These are rich with symbolism and allegory to world events. His novel Six Days (Sitat Ayam, 1961) is prophetically named for a real war yet to come in 1967; as such, it became a prelude to the later novel Days of Dust ('Awdat al-Ta'ir ila al-Bahr, 1969), which unfolds the existential drama of the June War of 1967.

Selected books

 
 
  Ta'ir al-Howm (1988) A novel in Arabic translated into English by Bassam Frangieh and Roger Allen.
 
 
 
 
 
 
 
 
  Sitat Ayam (1961), a novel in Arabic translated into English by Bassam Frangieh and Scott McGehee.
  From the Center for Contemporary Arab Studies' symposium, North Africa Today: Issues of Development and Integration, held at Georgetown University (1982). Introduction and chapter by Barakat.
 
 
  Awdat Altair Ila albahr (1969), a novel in Arabic translated into English by Trevor LeGassick with an introduction by Edward Said.
 
  A collection of short stories.

Additional books, articles, reviews, and recordings

 The Arab World: Society, Culture and State
 Worldcat Search for "Barakat, Halim"
 halimbarakat.com
 Google Scholar Search for Halim Barakat
 Google Books Search for Halim Barakat

Notes

1936 births
American University of Beirut alumni
University of Michigan College of Literature, Science, and the Arts alumni
Academic staff of the American University of Beirut
Harvard University faculty
University of Texas at Austin faculty
Georgetown University faculty
American people of Syrian descent
Syrian novelists
Syrian sociologists
Living people
People from Tartus